University of Kaiserslautern-Landau (also known as RPTU Kaiserslautern-Landau or RPTU) is a public research university in Kaiserslautern and Landau, Germany.

It was founded on January 1, 2023, by the merger of the former Technical University of Kaiserslautern with part of the University of Koblenz and Landau.

References

External links
Official website

Kaiserslautern
Technical universities and colleges in Germany